On 11 April 1951, U.S. President Harry S. Truman relieved General of the Army Douglas MacArthur of his commands after MacArthur made public statements that contradicted the administration's policies. MacArthur was a popular hero of World War II who was then commander of United Nations Command forces fighting in the Korean War, and his relief remains a controversial topic in the field of civil–military relations.

MacArthur led the Allied forces in the Southwest Pacific during World War II, and after the war was in charge of the occupation of Japan. In the latter role, MacArthur was able to accumulate considerable power over the civil administration of Japan. Eventually, he gained a level of political experience that has arguably been neither precedented nor repeated by anyone actively serving as a flag officer in the U.S. military.

When North Korea invaded South Korea in June 1950, starting the Korean War, MacArthur was designated commander of the United Nations forces defending South Korea. He conceived and executed the amphibious assault at Inchon on 15 September 1950, for which he was hailed as a military genius. However, when he followed up his victory with a full-scale invasion of North Korea on Truman's orders, China intervened in the war and inflicted a series of defeats, compelling him to withdraw from North Korea. By April 1951, the military situation had stabilized, but MacArthur continued to publicly criticize his superiors and attempt to escalate the conflict, leading Truman to relieve MacArthur of his commands. The Armed Services Committee and the Foreign Relations Committee of the U.S. Senate held a joint inquiry into the military situation and the circumstances surrounding MacArthur's relief, and concluded that "the removal of General MacArthur was within the constitutional powers of the President but the circumstances were a shock to national pride".

An apolitical military was an American tradition, but one that was difficult to uphold in an era when American forces were employed overseas in large numbers. The principle of civilian control of the military was also ingrained, but the rising complexity of military technology led to the creation of a professional military. This made civilian control increasingly problematic when coupled with the constitutional division of powers between the president as commander-in-chief, and Congress with its power to raise armies, maintain a navy, and declare war. In relieving MacArthur for failing to "respect the authority of the President" by privately communicating with Congress, Truman upheld the president's role as preeminent.

Background

Harry Truman 

Harry S. Truman became president of the United States on the death of Franklin D. Roosevelt in 1945, and won an unexpected victory in the 1948 presidential election. He was the only president who served after 1897 without a college degree. Although not highly educated, Truman was well read. When his high school friends went off to the state university in 1901, he enrolled in a local business school, but only lasted a semester. He later took night courses at the Kansas City Law School, but dropped out. Truman attempted to gain admission to the United States Military Academy at West Point, but was rejected for his poor eyesight. He was proud of his military service in the artillery during World War I, and continued to hold a reserve commission, eventually achieving the rank of colonel.

Instead of professional soldiers, Truman selected two National Guardsmen, Harry H. Vaughan and Louis H. Renfrow, as his military aides. Truman once remarked that he did not understand how the US Army could "produce men such as Robert E. Lee, John J. Pershing, Eisenhower, and Bradley and at the same time produce Custers, Pattons, and MacArthur".

During the 1948 Revolt of the Admirals, a number of naval officers publicly disagreed with the administration's policy over cuts to naval aviation and amphibious warfare capability, resulting in the relief of the Chief of Naval Operations, Admiral Louis Denfeld, and his replacement by Admiral Forrest Sherman. In testimony before the House Armed Services Committee investigation into the affair in October 1949, the Chairman of the Joint Chiefs of Staff, General Omar Bradley, doubted that there would ever be another large-scale amphibious operation.

Douglas MacArthur 

In stature and seniority, General of the Army Douglas MacArthur was the Army's foremost general. The son of Lieutenant General Arthur MacArthur, Jr., a recipient of the Medal of Honor for action during the American Civil War, he had graduated at the top of his West Point class of 1903, but never attended an advanced service school except for the engineer course in 1908. He had a distinguished combat record in World War I, and had served as Chief of Staff of the United States Army from 1930 to 1935, working closely with Presidents Herbert Hoover and Franklin Roosevelt, despite occasional clashes over the military budget. He would later compare Roosevelt's "extraordinary self-control" with Truman's "violent temper and paroxysms of ungovernable rage".

Apart from his World War I-era service in Mexico and Europe, his overseas postings had been in Asia and the Pacific. During World War II, he had become a national hero and had been awarded the Medal of Honor for the unsuccessful defense of the Philippines in the Battle of Bataan. He had commanded the Allied armies in the New Guinea Campaign and Philippines Campaign, fulfilling his famous promise to return to the Philippines. In 1944 and 1948, he had been considered a possible Republican candidate for president. After the war, as the Supreme Commander of the Allied Powers, he had overseen the occupation of Japan and played an important part in the post-war political and social transformation of that country.

By 1950, the occupation of Japan was winding down, but MacArthur remained in the country as Commander-in-Chief Far East, a post to which he had been appointed by Truman in 1945. MacArthur had to deal with deep cuts in the defense budget that saw his troop numbers decline from 300,000 in 1947 to 142,000 in 1948. Despite his protests, further reductions followed and, by June 1950, there were only 108,000 troops in his Far East Command. Cuts in funds and personnel produced shortages of serviceable equipment. Of the Far East Command's 18,000 jeeps, 10,000 were unserviceable; of its 13,780 -ton 6x6 trucks, only 4,441 were serviceable. On the positive side, Far East Command initiated a program of reclaiming and refurbishing war materiel from abandoned stocks throughout the Pacific. This had not only recovered a great deal of valuable stores and equipment, it had also generated a useful repair and rebuilding industry in Japan. Meanwhile, the shift away from occupation duties had permitted a greater focus on training for combat.

Events leading up to the relief

Korean War 

North Korea invaded South Korea on 25 June 1950, starting the Korean War. In response to an urgent request from the Korean Military Advisory Group for more ammunition, MacArthur, on his own initiative, ordered the transport ship MSTS Sgt. George D Keathley, then in harbor in Yokohama, to be loaded with ammunition and to sail for Pusan. President Truman met with the Joint Chiefs of Staff and other advisors that day at Blair House and approved the actions already taken by MacArthur and Secretary of State Dean Acheson. At another meeting at Blair House held on the evening of 26 June, amid reports of a rapidly deteriorating situation in South Korea, Truman approved the use of air and naval forces against military targets south of the 38th parallel north.

Subsequently, on 27 June, the United Nations Security Council passed Resolution 83, which recommended that "members of the United Nations furnish such assistance to the Republic of Korea as may be necessary to repel the armed attack and to restore international peace and security in the area". The South Korean capital of Seoul fell on 28 June. The next day, Truman authorized air and naval operations north of the 38th parallel, which MacArthur had already ordered. However it was not until 30 June, following a sobering report on the military situation from MacArthur, that Truman finally authorized the use of ground forces.

On 8 July, on the advice of the Joint Chiefs of Staff, Truman appointed MacArthur as commander of United Nations Command in South Korea. He remained Commander-in-Chief Far East and Supreme Commander of the Allied Powers. MacArthur was forced to commit his forces in Japan to what he later described as a "desperate rearguard action". In July, Truman sent the Chief of Staff of the Army, General J. Lawton Collins, and the Chief of Staff of the Air Force, General Hoyt S. Vandenberg, to report on the situation. They met with MacArthur and his chief of staff, Major General Edward Almond, in Tokyo on 13 July. MacArthur impressed on them the danger of underestimating the North Koreans, whom he characterized as "well-equipped, well-led, and battle-trained, and which have at times out-numbered our troops by as much as twenty to one". He proposed to first halt the North Korean advance and then counterattack, enveloping the North Koreans with an amphibious operation, but the timing was dependent on the arrival of reinforcements from the United States.

Bradley raised the possibility of using nuclear weapons in Korea at a Joint Chiefs of Staff meeting on 9 July 1950 at Eisenhower's instigation, but there was no support for the idea. The Army staff sent a cable to Collins in Tokyo suggesting that he seek out MacArthur's opinion. In a teleconference on 13 July, Major General Charles L. Bolte proposed sending nuclear weapons. MacArthur had already turned down Air Force proposals to fire bomb North Korean cities, and suggested that atomic bombs could be used to isolate North Korea by taking out bridges and tunnels. The Army staff considered this impractical. However, on 28 July, the Joint Chiefs decided to send ten nuclear-capable B-29 bombers of the 9th Bombardment Wing to Guam as a deterrent to Chinese action against Taiwan. Truman publicly denied that he was considering the use of nuclear weapons in Korea, but authorized the transfer to Guam of atomic bombs without their fissile cores. The deployment did not go well; one of the bombers crashed on takeoff from Fairfield-Suisun Air Force Base in California on 5 August, killing the mission commander, Brigadier General Robert F. Travis, and 18 others. The remaining nine bombers remained in Guam until 13 September, when they returned to the United States. The bomb assemblies stayed behind.

At a press conference on 13 July, Truman was asked if United States forces would cross the 38th parallel into North Korea, and he replied that he would "make that decision when it becomes necessary to do it". Some of his advisors, most notably the Assistant Secretary of State for Far Eastern Affairs, Dean Rusk, and the Director of the Office of Northeast Asian Affairs, John M. Allison, argued that Security Council Resolution 83 provided a legal basis for the invasion of North Korea. Others, notably George F. Kennan and Paul Nitze, disagreed. In addition to the legality, the administration also had to consider the danger of intervention by the Soviet Union or the People's Republic of China if United Nations forces approached their borders.

Battle of Inchon 

MacArthur's early ambitions for an amphibious operation against North Korea had to be shelved due to the deteriorating situation in the south, which compelled him to commit the formation earmarked for the assault, the 1st Cavalry Division, to the defence of the Pusan Perimeter, to which the Eighth Army retreated in August. MacArthur then resumed his planning for an amphibious operation, which he tentatively scheduled for 15 September 1950. Navy and Marine Corps officers like Rear Admiral James H. Doyle, the commander of Amphibious Group One, and Major General Oliver P. Smith, the commander of the 1st Marine Division, were appalled by the proposed landing beaches at Inchon, which featured huge tides, broad mudflats, narrow and treacherous channels, and high seawalls. Omar Bradley called it "the worst possible place ever selected for an amphibious landing". While the Inchon-Seoul area was a key communications center, the risks of the landing were daunting. Collins and Sherman flew to Tokyo to be briefed on the plans by MacArthur, who declared: "We shall land at Inchon, and I shall crush them."

MacArthur was invited to speak at the 51st National Encampment of the Veterans of Foreign Wars in Chicago on 26 August 1950. He declined the invitation, but instead sent a statement that could be read out aloud, in which he contradicted Truman's policy towards the island of Formosa, saying: "Nothing could be more fallacious than the threadbare argument by those who advocate appeasement and defeatism in the Pacific that if we defend Formosa we alienate continental Asia." Truman was infuriated by the word "appeasement," and discussed the possibility of relieving MacArthur with Secretary of Defense Louis A. Johnson. Johnson responded that MacArthur was "one of the greatest, if not the greatest generals of our generation". Truman told Johnson to send MacArthur an order withdrawing his statement, which he did; but it had already been read into Congressional Record. As it turned out, it was not MacArthur who was relieved, but Johnson. Truman had become irritated with Johnson's conflict with Secretary of State Acheson, and although he had said that Johnson would remain his Secretary of Defense for "as long as I am President," he asked Johnson for his resignation. Publicly, Johnson received much of the blame for the defense cuts that had led to the lack of preparedness and consequent early defeats in Korea. He was replaced by General of the Army George Marshall.

MacArthur held that his military objective was the destruction of the North Korean Army. That being the case, operations would be necessary north of the 38th parallel, although his Assistant Chief of Staff, G-2, Major General Charles A. Willoughby, warned on 31 August that 37 Chinese divisions were grouping on the border between China and North Korea. The Joint Chiefs agreed with MacArthur on this issue. A National Security Council paper endorsed the legality of action north of the 38th parallel. The paper recommended that only South Korean troops be employed in the border regions with China and Russia. Should the Soviet Union intervene, MacArthur was to immediately retreat to the 38th parallel; but in the case of Chinese intervention, he was to keep fighting "as long as action by UN military forces offers a reasonable chance of successful resistance". Truman endorsed the report on 11 September, but MacArthur remained in the dark because of the changeover of Secretaries of Defense, and was not informed until 22 September. When Truman was asked at a press conference on 21 September whether he had concluded to conduct operations in North Korea, he replied that he had not.

In the meantime, MacArthur's amphibious assault at Inchon went ahead on 15 September. "The success of Inchon was so great and the subsequent prestige of General MacArthur was so overpowering," Collins later recalled, "that the Chiefs hesitated thereafter to question later plans and decisions of the general, which should have been challenged." In response to a rumor that the Eighth Army planned to halt at the 38th parallel and await United Nations authorization to cross, Marshall sent a message to MacArthur informing him that: "We want you to feel unhampered tactically and strategically to proceed north of 38th parallel. Announcement above referred to may precipitate embarrassment in the UN where evident desire is not to be confronted with necessity of a vote on passage, rather to find you have found it militarily necessary to do so." A few days later, MacArthur was instructed not to issue an announcement that his forces had crossed the 38th parallel. On 7 October a United Nations General Assembly Resolution was passed that could be broadly construed as permitting the invasion of North Korea.

Wake Island Conference 

With the 1950 mid-term elections drawing near, and Truman abstaining from overt campaigning while the troops were fighting in Korea, members of Truman's staff, most notably George Elsey, came up with another way to garner votes for the Democratic Party. In July 1944, President Franklin Roosevelt had traveled to Hawaii to meet with MacArthur and Admiral Chester Nimitz. At this meeting, Roosevelt made the decision to attack the Philippines in the final year of the Pacific war. It was a political triumph in an election year, refuting Republican claims that Roosevelt fixated on Europe at the expense of the Pacific.

Truman emulated this by flying to the Pacific to meet MacArthur. Initially, Truman was unenthusiastic about the idea, as he disliked publicity stunts, but in October 1950, in the wake of the victories at Pusan and Inchon, MacArthur's star was burning bright. By meeting with him, Truman could emphasize his own part in the victories, as Commander-in-Chief. A message was sent to MacArthur suggesting a meeting on Hawaii or Wake Island. MacArthur replied that he "would be delighted to meet the President on the morning of the 15th at Wake Island". When MacArthur discovered that the President would be bringing the news media with him, MacArthur asked if he could bring correspondents from Tokyo. His request was denied.

Truman arrived at Wake Island on 15 October, where he was greeted on the tarmac by MacArthur, who had arrived the day before. MacArthur shook hands with the President rather than salute, and declined an offer to stay for lunch with the President, which Bradley considered "insulting". This did not bother Truman; what did annoy the President, a former haberdasher, was MacArthur's "greasy ham and eggs cap that evidently had been in use for twenty years". The meeting, which had no agenda and no structure, took the form of a free-wheeling discussion between the President and his advisors on one hand, and MacArthur and the  Commander in Chief, Pacific Fleet, Admiral Arthur Radford, on the other. Topics discussed included Formosa, the Philippines and the wars in Vietnam and Korea. MacArthur noted that "No new policies, no new strategy of war or international politics, were proposed or discussed." Robert Sherrod, who was present as a correspondent, felt that he "had witnessed nothing but a political grandstand play".

However, MacArthur did say things that would later be used against him. When asked by the President about the odds of Soviet or Chinese intervention in Korea, MacArthur replied:

MacArthur expressed the hope that the Eighth Army could withdraw to Japan by the end of the year. When Bradley asked if a division could be sent to Europe, MacArthur replied that he could make one available in January. In fact, Chinese troops had already begun crossing the Yalu into North Korea, and by November 180,000 had done so.

Chinese intervention 
When he returned from Wake, MacArthur faced the challenge of turning his promises into reality. On 24 October, he ordered his principal subordinates, Lieutenant General Walton Walker, the commander of the Eighth Army, and Major General Edward Almond of X Corps, to "drive forward with all speed and full utilization of all their force". He also lifted the prohibition on troops other than South Koreans operating along the borders with China and the Soviet Union. Collins considered this a violation of the orders that the Joint Chiefs had issued on 27 September, but MacArthur pointed out that it was only, in the words of the original directive, "a matter of policy". He added that the matter had been raised at Wake Island, but no one else recalled this, particularly not Truman, who, unaware of these discussions, told reporters on 26 October that Koreans and not Americans would occupy the border areas. Within days, MacArthur's forces had encountered the Chinese in the Battle of Onjong and the Battle of Unsan.

Truman did not relieve MacArthur for the military reverses in Korea in November and December 1950. Truman later stated that he felt that MacArthur was no more to blame than General of the Army Dwight Eisenhower was for the military reverses he had suffered during the Battle of the Bulge. But this did not mean that it did not factor into his decision. "I considered him a great strategist," Truman later recalled, "until he made the march into North Korea without the knowledge that he should have had of the Chinese coming in."

In an attempt to slow the Chinese advance, MacArthur ordered the bridges across the Yalu to be bombed. After due consultation with his advisers, Truman declared that he would not approve of such an action, and the Joint Chiefs cancelled the order. When MacArthur protested, the President and the Joint Chiefs authorized the bombings, subject to the caveat that Chinese air space not be violated. Major General Emmett O'Donnell would later cite this to the Congressional inquiry into MacArthur's relief as an example of undue political interference in military operations. The Yalu River had many bends, and in some cases there were very restricted lines of approach without overflying the Yalu. This made life easier for the Communist antiaircraft gunners, but correspondingly less so for the aircrew. Within weeks, MacArthur was forced to retreat, and both Truman and MacArthur were forced to contemplate the prospect of abandoning Korea entirely.

Nuclear weapons 
At a press conference on 30 November 1950, Truman was asked about the use of nuclear weapons: The implication was that the authority to use atomic weapons now rested in the hands of MacArthur. Truman's White House issued a clarification, noting that "only the President can authorize the use of the atom bomb, and no such authorization has been given," yet the comment still caused a domestic and international stir. Truman had touched upon one of the most sensitive issues in civil-military relations in the post-World War II period: civilian control of nuclear weapons, which was enshrined in the Atomic Energy Act of 1946.

On 9 December 1950, MacArthur requested field commander's discretion to employ nuclear weapons; he testified that such an employment would only be used to prevent an ultimate fallback, not to recover the situation in Korea. On 24 December 1950, while responding to a formal request from the Pentagon, specifically Major General Charles L. Bolte, about a hypothetical question regarding which targets should be bombed with atomic weapons if the Soviets got directly involved in the Korean War or if the Chinese military sent bombers to bomb UN forces in Korea and Japan from mainland China, MacArthur submitted a list of "retardation targets" in Korea, Manchuria and other parts of China, for which 34 atomic bombs would be required. In June 1950, Louis Johnson released a study on the potential uses of radioactive  agents. According to Major General Courtney Whitney, MacArthur considered the possibility of using radioactive wastes to seal off North Korea in December 1950, but he never submitted this to the Joint Chiefs. After his dismissal, Senator Albert Gore Sr. put a similar proposal to Truman. In January 1951, MacArthur refused to entertain proposals for the forward deployment of nuclear weapons. On a similar note, showing MacArthur directly rejecting the use of weapons of mass destruction when he had the power to answer a subordinate, in  January 1951 he immediately rejected Lieutenant General Matthew Ridgway's urgent request to use chemical weapons on Chinese and North Korean soldiers. While MacArthur made many statements regarding nuclear weapons after 1951, there has never been evidence, like memos or transcriptions of meetings, provided by anyone that MacArthur ever requested to use nuclear weapons or tried to push Truman or other Pentagon officials to use them during the Korean War while he was the UN Commander.

In early April 1951, the Joint Chiefs became alarmed by the build up of Soviet forces in the Far East, particularly bombers and submarines. On 5 April 1951, they drafted orders for MacArthur authorizing attacks on Manchuria and the Shantung Peninsula if the Chinese launched airstrikes against his forces originating from there. The next day Truman met with the chairman of the United States Atomic Energy Commission, Gordon Dean, and arranged for the transfer of nine Mark 4 nuclear bombs to military control. Dean was apprehensive about delegating the decision on how they should be used to MacArthur, who lacked expert technical knowledge of the weapons and their effects. The Joint Chiefs were not entirely comfortable about giving them to MacArthur either, for fear that he might prematurely carry out his orders. Instead, they decided that the nuclear strike force would report to the Strategic Air Command (SAC). This time the bombers deployed with the fissile cores. SAC did not intend to attack air bases and depots; the bombers would target industrial cities in North Korea and China. Deployments of SAC bombers to Guam continued until the end of the war.

There has been debate whether MacArthur advocated the employment of nuclear weapons, including over whether his submission to the Joint Chiefs of Staff was tantamount to a recommendation. In the 21st century, the U.S. government declassified the full December 1950 messages between Major General Charles L. Bolte and MacArthur that MacArthur was responding to. The first message by Bolte, a formal request which was classified for over fifty years, asked MacArthur which specific sites in China and Korea do UN forces need to use atomic bombs on to neutralize the threat if there was a major escalation of the war by the Soviets or Chinese. MacArthur's famous answer with the dozens of nuclear weapons was actually the second message and he was simply answering the Pentagon's hypothetical question with one of the pre-determined nuclear targets lists that was already studied and created by the War/Defense Department in the 1940s. In his testimony before the Senate Inquiry, he stated that he had not recommended their use. In 1960, MacArthur challenged a statement by Truman that he had wanted to use nuclear weapons, saying that "atomic bombing in the Korean War was never discussed either by my headquarters or in any communication to or from Washington"; Truman, admitting that he did not have documentation of any such claim, said that he was merely providing his personal opinion. In interview with Jim G. Lucas and Bob Considine on 25 January 1954, posthumously published in 1964,  MacArthur said, 
In 1985 Richard Nixon recalled discussing the atomic bombings of Hiroshima and Nagasaki with MacArthur:

Foreign pressure 

The British Prime Minister, Clement Attlee, was particularly disturbed by Truman's gaffe about nuclear weapons, and sought to revive the wartime Quebec Agreement, under which the United States would not use nuclear weapons without Britain's consent. The British were concerned that the United States was drifting into a war with China. In a visit to the United States in December 1950, Attlee raised the fears of the British and other European governments that "General MacArthur was running the show". As MacArthur's views about the importance of Asia in world affairs were well known, it was feared that the United States would shift its focus away from Europe. In this instance, MacArthur was defended by Bradley, whose anglophobia dated back to World War II.

The British became alarmed in January 1951 when the Americans began talking of evacuating Korea. The British argued that to maintain European faith and unity it was vital to maintain some presence in Korea, even if it was nothing more than a toehold in the Pusan area. Once again, Bradley defended MacArthur, but it was clear that he had become an irritant in the relationship between the two countries. However, the alliance with Britain itself was unpopular in Congress. House Minority Leader Joseph William Martin, Jr. slammed Truman for following Attlee's Britain to "slavery to government and crippling debt".

Public statements 
On 1 December 1950, MacArthur was asked by a reporter if the restrictions on operations against Chinese forces on the far side of the Yalu River were "a handicap to effective military operations". He replied that they were indeed "an enormous handicap, unprecedented in military history". On 6 December, Truman issued a directive requiring all military officers and diplomatic officials to clear with the State Department all but routine statements before making them public, "and...refrain from direct communications on military or foreign policy with newspapers, magazines, and other publicity media". Major General Courtney Whitney gave MacArthur a legal opinion that this applied "solely to formal public statements and not to communiqués, correspondence or personal conversations". MacArthur made similar remarks in press statements on 13 February and 7 March 1951.

In February and March 1951, the tide of war began to turn again, and MacArthur's forces drove north. Seoul, which had fallen on 4 January, was recaptured on 17 March. This raised hopes in Washington that the Chinese and North Koreans might be amenable to a ceasefire agreement, and Truman prepared a statement to this effect. MacArthur was informed of it by the Joint Chiefs on 20 March, and he warned the new commander of the Eighth Army, Lieutenant General Matthew B. Ridgway, that political constraints might soon impose limits on his proposed operations. On 23 March, MacArthur issued a communiqué about offering a ceasefire to the Chinese:

Truman would later report that "I was ready to kick him into the North China Sea...I was never so put out in my life." Truman felt that MacArthur's communiqué, which had not been cleared in accordance with the December directive, had pre-empted his own proposal. He later wrote:

For the moment, however, he did. There had been dramatic confrontations over policy before, the most notable of which was between President Abraham Lincoln and Major General George McClellan, in 1862. Another example was President James Polk's recall of Major General Winfield Scott after the Mexican–American War. Before relieving MacArthur, Truman consulted history books on how Lincoln and Polk dealt with their generals. Truman later said that Polk was his favorite president because "he had the courage to tell Congress to go to Hell on foreign policy matters".

There were genuine differences of opinion over policy between MacArthur and the Truman administration. One was MacArthur's deep-seated belief that it was not possible to separate the struggle against Communism in Europe from that going on in Asia. This was seen as the result of being stationed for too many years in East Asia, and of his perspective as a theater commander responsible only for part of the Far East. Another important policy difference was MacArthur's belief that China was not, as Acheson maintained, "the Soviet Union's largest and most important satellite," but an independent state with its own agenda that, in MacArthur's words, "for its own purposes is [just temporarily] allied with Soviet Russia". If MacArthur's thesis was accepted, then it followed that expanding the war with China would not provoke a conflict with the Soviet Union. The Joint Chiefs emphatically disagreed, although this contradicted their position that it was Europe and not Asia that was the prime concern of the Soviet Union. Even among Republicans, there was little support for MacArthur's position.

On 5 April, Martin read the text of a letter he had received from MacArthur, dated 20 March, criticizing the Truman administration's priorities on the floor of the House. In it, MacArthur had written:

MacArthur later wrote that Martin had released the letter "for some unexplained reason and without consulting me", but it had not been marked as being confidential or off the record.

Diplomatic dispatch intercepts 
The practice of intercepting and decrypting diplomatic messages of friend and foe alike was a closely held secret in the 1950s. In mid-March 1951, Truman learned through such intercepts that MacArthur had conversations with diplomats in Spain's and Portugal's Tokyo embassies. In these talks, MacArthur had expressed confidence that he would succeed in expanding the Korean War into a major conflict resulting in the permanent disposal of the "Chinese Communist question" and MacArthur did not want either country to be alarmed if this happened. The content of this particular intercept was known by only a very few of Truman's closest advisers, two being Paul Nitze, Director of the Policy Planning Staff of the State Department, and his associate, Charles Burton Marshall. Truman considered MacArthur's conversations outright treachery and concluded that MacArthur had to be relieved but was unable to act immediately because of MacArthur's political support and to avoid broader knowledge of the existence of the electronic intercepts of diplomatic messages. Interestingly, several weeks earlier, MacArthur had recommended to the Joint Chiefs of Staff that he be authorized to retaliate immediately against targets on the Chinese mainland in the event of Chinese Communist air or sea attacks against Formosa (now Taiwan) or United States forces outside Korea. The Joint Chiefs responded by granting qualified approval.

Provoking China 
Ridgway had prepared an offensive known as Operation Rugged, and pressed MacArthur for permission to launch it. On 15 March 1951, the day after Seoul had been recaptured a second time, Truman had responded to a reporter's question about whether UN forces would again be allowed to move north of the 38th Parallel by saying that it would be "a tactical matter for the field commander". MacArthur thereupon gave Ridgway permission to launch his attack, setting an objective line north of the 38th Parallel that would secure Seoul's water supply. He did so without consulting with Washington until after the attack began on 5 April 1951. It was making steady progress when MacArthur was relieved on 11 April.

At 11:00 on 11 April, Task Force 77 operating near the west coast of Taiwan, commenced an "aerial parade" along the east coast of mainland China. Although Task Force 77 was conducting its aerial parade over the horizon to the west, nearly two hours passed before aircraft from the task force appeared over Swatow and made threatening passes at the Chinese vessels and the port city. MacArthur officially received notification of his dismissal shortly after 15:00 Tokyo time (14:00 on the China coast), although he had found out about it half an hour before. Two hours later, the Bole retired from its station without hostile action being initiated by either side. Author James Edwin Alexander expressed the opinion that the Bole and its crew were made "sitting ducks" by MacArthur trying to provoke the Chinese into attacking a U.S. warship in an attempt to expand the conflict. Rear Admiral Samuel J. Cox, director of the Naval History and Heritage Command, stated that while some historians like Alexander had circumstantial evidence that this was a provocation plot by MacArthur, there is no direct evidence to prove that claim. Cox said it was also possible that the ship was on an intelligence mission to directly observe the junk ships because for over a month the U.S. military was greatly worried about a Chinese invasion of Taiwan after witnessing an unusually large armada of junk boats, which would potentially be the invasion fleet, gathering together on the Chinese coast opposite of Taiwan.

Relief 

On the morning of 6 April 1951, Truman held a meeting in his office with Marshall, Bradley, Acheson, and Harriman to discuss what would be done about MacArthur. Harriman was emphatically in favor of MacArthur's relief, but Bradley opposed it. George Marshall asked for more time to consider the matter. Acheson was personally in favor of relieving MacArthur but did not disclose this. Instead, he warned Truman that it would be "the biggest fight of your administration". At a second meeting the next day, Marshall and Bradley continued to oppose relief. On 8 April, the Joint Chiefs met with Marshall in his office. Each of the chiefs in turn expressed the opinion that MacArthur's relief was desirable from a "military point of view," but they recognized that military considerations were not paramount. They were concerned that "if MacArthur were not relieved, a large segment of our people would charge that civil authorities no longer controlled the military". The four advisers met with Truman in his office again on 9 April. Bradley informed the president of the views of the Joint Chiefs, and Marshall added that he agreed with them. Truman wrote in his diary that "it is of unanimous opinion of all that MacArthur be relieved. All four so advise." Later, before Congress, the Joint Chiefs would insist that they had only "concurred" with the relief, not "recommended" it.

On 11 April 1951, President Truman drafted an order to MacArthur, which was issued under Bradley's signature:

In a 1973 article from Time magazine, Truman was quoted as saying in the early 1960s:

Although Truman and Acheson accused MacArthur of insubordination, the Joint Chiefs avoided any suggestion of this. MacArthur was not, in fact, relieved for insubordination. Insubordination was a military offense, and MacArthur could have requested a public court martial similar to that of Billy Mitchell in the 1920s. The outcome of such a trial was uncertain, and it might well have found him not guilty and ordered his reinstatement. The Joint Chiefs agreed that there was "little evidence that General MacArthur had ever failed to carry out a direct order of the Joint Chiefs, or acted in opposition to an order". "In point of fact," Bradley insisted, "MacArthur had stretched but not legally violated any JCS directives. He had violated the President's 6 December directive, relayed to him by the JCS, but this did not constitute violation of a JCS order."

The intention was that MacArthur would be personally notified of his relief by Secretary of the Army Frank Pace, who was touring the front in Korea, at 20:00 on 11 April (Washington, D.C. time), which was 10:00 on 12 April (Tokyo time). However, Pace did not receive the message due to a signals failure in Korea. Meanwhile, reporters began asking if rumors of MacArthur's relief were true. Truman then "decided that we could not afford the courtesy of Secretary Pace's personal delivery of the order," and called a press conference at which he issued his statement to the press:

In Tokyo, MacArthur and his wife were at a luncheon at the American embassy for Senator Warren Magnuson and William Stern, executive vice president of Northwest Airlines, when Colonel Sidney Huff, MacArthur's aide and one of the "Bataan gang" who had escaped from Corregidor with the general in 1942, heard about the relief from commercial radio broadcast. Huff promptly informed Mrs. MacArthur, who in turn told the general. Japanese radio stations soon picked up the story, but the official notice would not arrive for another half hour.

Issues

Civilian control of the military 
Civilian control of the military is an American tradition dating back to the founding of the republic. In his 1965 memoirs, Truman wrote:
Following the relief, most of the avalanche of mail and messages sent to the White House by the public supported MacArthur. On issues like character, integrity, honor and service, they rated MacArthur as the better man. What support Truman garnered was largely based on the principle of civilian control.

"The United States Constitution", wrote Samuel P. Huntington, "despite widespread belief to the contrary, does  provide for civilian control." It drew no distinction between civil and military responsibilities, and provided for no subordination of the one to the other. By dividing responsibility for the military between the executive and the legislature, it made control more difficult. Any attempt by one branch to assert control would likely involve a clash with the other. Debates nominally about civilian control were usually, in practice, about which branch would exercise control rather than how control would be exercised. The framers of the constitution did not consider the issue of the management of a distinct and technically sophisticated military profession because no such thing existed at the time. It appeared in the 19th century as a result of social changes brought about by the French Revolution, and technological changes wrought by the industrial revolution. While the framers believed in civilian control of the military, they framed it in terms of a people's militia in which civilian and military were one and the same.

Apolitical military 
Another American tradition is that of an apolitical military, although this custom was of more recent origin, dating back only to the period after the American Civil War. Few officers voted in the 19th century, but not so much from a lack of interest in politics as because frequently moving from state to state and living on Federal land effectively disenfranchised them under the laws of many states and/or made it impractical for them to vote at a time when casting a ballot in person on Election Day was the only way to vote. It was only under General of the Army William T. Sherman, the Commanding General of the United States Army from 1869 to 1883, who hated politics, that the custom of an apolitical military became firmly established.

Nor, unlike their European counterparts, did American generals and admirals have influence on or involvement in foreign policy; but mainly because in the frontier Army of MacArthur's youth, there was no requirement to do so. This began to change after the Spanish–American War, when American military forces started to be deployed overseas in the Pacific, Asia and the Caribbean for extended periods of time.

The concept of the theater of war developed during World War II. At such a senior level of command, military and political issues tended to merge. As theater commander in the Southwest Pacific, MacArthur had been accountable to the Australian government as well as his own, making him, in President Roosevelt's words to him, "an ambassador as well as Supreme Commander". MacArthur's less than wholehearted support for the "Europe first" strategy was apt to cause annoyance in Washington when the chain of command was bypassed by MacArthur through the Prime Minister of Australia, John Curtin.

General Marshall expressed this conflict in his testimony before the Senate:

Powers of the President 
In The Federalist Papers, Alexander Hamilton argued that: 

But on 26 June 1950, Truman sent the armed forces into Korea without any such Congressional mandate. The subsequent United Nations Security Council resolution authorized military assistance to South Korea, but the United Nations Participation Act laid down that:

The Congressional inquiry triggered by MacArthur's relief ruled that Truman's actions violated both constitutional and statutory requirements. While presidents had in the past used extra-legal military force, this was in "fights with pirates, landings of small naval contingents on barbarous or semi-barbarous coasts, the dispatch of small bodies of troops to chase bandits or cattle rustlers across the Mexican border, and the like". Congressman Vito Marcantonio, who opposed the war in Korea, argued that "when we agreed to the United Nations Charter we never agreed to supplant our Constitution with the United Nations Charter. The power to declare and make war is vested in the representatives of the people, in the Congress of the United States."

Senator William F. Knowland noted that:

Aftermath

Responses to the relief 

The news of MacArthur's relief was greeted with shock in Japan. The Diet of Japan passed a resolution of gratitude for MacArthur, and the Emperor Hirohito visited him at the embassy in person, the first time a Japanese Emperor had ever visited a foreigner with no standing. The Mainichi Shimbun said:

In the Chicago Tribune, Senator Robert A. Taft called for immediate impeachment proceedings against Truman:

Newspapers like the Chicago Tribune and the Los Angeles Times opined that MacArthur's "hasty and vindictive" relief was due to foreign pressure, particularly from the United Kingdom and the British socialists in Attlee's government. The Republican Party whip, Senator Kenneth S. Wherry, charged that the relief was the result of pressure from "the Socialist Government of Great Britain".

On 17 April 1951, MacArthur flew back to the United States, a country he had not seen since 1937. When he reached San Francisco he was greeted by the commander of the Sixth United States Army, Lieutenant General Albert C. Wedemeyer. MacArthur received a parade there that was attended by 500,000 people. He was greeted on arrival at Washington National Airport on 19 April by the Joint Chiefs of Staff and General Jonathan Wainwright. Truman sent Vaughan as his representative, which was seen as a slight, as Vaughan was despised by the public and professional soldiers alike as a corrupt crony. "It was a shameful thing to fire MacArthur, and even more shameful to send Vaughan," one member of the public wrote to Truman.

MacArthur addressed a joint session of Congress where he delivered his famous "Old Soldiers Never Die" speech, in which he declared:

In response, the Pentagon issued a press release noting that "the action taken by the President in relieving General MacArthur was based upon the unanimous recommendations of the President's principal civilian and military advisers including the Joint Chiefs of Staff". Afterwards, MacArthur flew to New York City where he received the largest ticker-tape parade in history up to that time. He also visited Chicago and Milwaukee, where he addressed large rallies.

Congressional inquiry 
In May and June 1951, the Senate Armed Services Committee and the Senate Foreign Relations Committee held "an inquiry into the military situation in the Far East and the facts surrounding the relief of General of the Army Douglas MacArthur". The Senate thereby attempted to avoid a constitutional crisis. Because of the sensitive political and military topics being discussed, the inquiry was held in closed session, and only a heavily censored transcript was made public until 1973. The two committees were jointly chaired by Senator Richard Russell, Jr. Fourteen witnesses were called: MacArthur, Marshall, Bradley, Collins, Vandenberg, Sherman, Adrian S. Fisher, Acheson, Wedemeyer, Johnson, Oscar C. Badger II, Patrick J. Hurley, and David G. Barr and O'Donnell.

The testimony of Marshall and the Joint Chiefs rebutted many of MacArthur's arguments. Marshall emphatically declared that there had been no disagreement between himself, the President, and the Joint Chiefs. However, it also exposed their own timidity in dealing with MacArthur, and that they had not always kept him fully informed. Vandenberg questioned whether the Air Force could be effective against targets in Manchuria, while Bradley noted that the Communists were also waging limited war in Korea, having not attacked UN airbases or ports, or their own "privileged sanctuary" in Japan. Their judgment was that it was not worth it to expand the war, although they conceded that they were prepared to do so if the Communists escalated the conflict, or if no willingness to negotiate was forthcoming. They also disagreed with MacArthur's assessment of the effectiveness of the South Korean and Chinese Nationalist forces. Bradley said:

The committees concluded that "the removal of General MacArthur was within the constitutional powers of the President but the circumstances were a shock to national pride". They also found that "there was no serious disagreement between General MacArthur and the Joint Chiefs of Staff as to military strategy." They recommended that "the United States should never again become involved in war without the consent of the Congress".

Fallout 
Polls showed that the majority of the public still disapproved of Truman's decision to relieve MacArthur, and were more inclined to agree with MacArthur than with Bradley or Marshall. Truman's approval rating fell to 23 percent in mid-1951, which was lower than Richard Nixon's low of 25 percent during the Watergate Scandal in 1974, and Lyndon Johnson's of 28 percent at the height of the Vietnam War in 1968. , it is the lowest Gallup Poll approval rating recorded by any serving president.

The increasingly unpopular war in Korea dragged on, and the Truman administration was beset with a series of corruption scandals. He eventually decided not to run for re-election. Adlai Stevenson, the Democratic candidate in the 1952 presidential election, attempted to distance himself from the President as much as possible. The election was won by the Republican candidate, General of the Army Dwight D. Eisenhower, whose administration ramped up the pressure on the Chinese in Korea with conventional bombing and renewed threats of using nuclear weapons. Coupled with a more favorable international political climate in the wake of the death of Joseph Stalin in 1953, this led the Chinese and North Koreans to agree to terms. The belief that the threat of nuclear weapons played an important part in the outcome would lead to their threatened use against China on a number of occasions during the 1950s.

As a result of their support of Truman, the Joint Chiefs became viewed as politically tainted. Senator Taft regarded Bradley in particular with suspicion, due to Bradley's focus on Europe at the expense of Asia. Taft urged Eisenhower to replace the chiefs as soon as possible. First to go was Vandenberg, who had terminal cancer and had already announced plans to retire. On 7 May 1953, Eisenhower announced that he would be replaced by General Nathan Twining. Soon after it was announced that Bradley would be replaced by Admiral Arthur W. Radford, the Commander-in-Chief of the United States Pacific Command, Collins would be succeeded by Ridgway, and Admiral William Fechteler, who had become CNO on the death of Sherman in July 1951, by Admiral Robert B. Carney.

Legacy 
The relief of MacArthur cast a long shadow over American civil-military relations. When Lyndon Johnson met with General William Westmoreland in Honolulu in 1966, he told him: "General, I have a lot riding on you. I hope you don't pull a MacArthur on me." For his part, Westmoreland and his senior colleagues were eager to avoid any hint of dissent or challenge to presidential authority. This came at a high price. In his 1998 book Dereliction of Duty: Lyndon Johnson, Robert McNamara, the Joint Chiefs of Staff, and the Lies That Led to Vietnam, then-Lieutenant Colonel H. R. McMaster argued that the Joint Chiefs failed in their duty to provide the President, Secretary of Defense Robert McNamara or Congress with frank and fearless professional advice. This book was an influential one; the Chairman of the Joint Chiefs of Staff at the time, General Hugh Shelton, gave copies to every four-star officer in the military.

On the one hand, the relief of MacArthur established a precedent that generals and admirals could be fired for any public or private disagreement with government policy. In 1977, Major General John K. Singlaub publicly criticized proposed cuts in the size of American forces in South Korea, and was summarily relieved by President Jimmy Carter for making statements "inconsistent with announced national security policy". During the Gulf War in 1990, Secretary of Defense Dick Cheney relieved the Chief of Staff of the Air Force, General Michael Dugan, for showing "poor judgment at a very sensitive time" in making a series of statements to the media during a visit to Saudi Arabia. In 2010, President Barack Obama fired General Stanley A. McChrystal after McChrystal and his staff made disparaging remarks about senior civilian government officials in an article published in Rolling Stone magazine. This elicited comparisons with MacArthur, as the war in Afghanistan was not going well. On the other hand, Major General James N. Post III was relieved and issued a letter of reprimand in 2015 for discouraging personnel under his command from communicating with the Congress, which he described as "treason".

MacArthur's relief "left a lasting current of popular sentiment that in matters of war and peace, the military really knows best," a philosophy that became known as "MacArthurism". In February 2012, Lieutenant Colonel Daniel L. Davis published a report entitled "Dereliction of Duty II" in which he criticized senior military commanders for misleading Congress about the war in Afghanistan, especially General David Petraeus, noting that:

During the 1992 presidential election, Bill Clinton used endorsements from the former Chairman of the Joint Chiefs of Staff, Admiral William J. Crowe, and 21 other retired generals and flag officers to counter doubts about his ability to serve as Commander in Chief. This became a feature of later presidential election campaigns. During the 2004 presidential election, twelve retired generals and admirals endorsed Senator John Kerry, including former Chairman of the Joint Chiefs of Staff, Admiral William Crowe, and the former Chief of Staff of the Air Force, General Merrill "Tony" McPeak, who also appeared in television advertisements defending Kerry against the Swift Boat Veterans for Truth. During this election campaign, one retired four-star General, Tommy Franks, spoke at the Republican National Convention while another, John Shalikashvili, addressed the Democratic National Convention.

In early 2006, in what was called the "Generals Revolt," six retired generals, Major General John Batiste, Major General Paul D. Eaton, Lieutenant General Gregory Newbold, Major General John M. Riggs, Major General Charles H. Swannack Jr. and General Anthony C. Zinni, called for the resignation of Secretary of Defense Donald Rumsfeld, accusing him of "abysmal" military planning and lack of strategic competence. The ethics of a system under which serving generals felt compelled to publicly support policies that they privately believed were potentially ruinous for the country and cost the lives of military personnel, did not escape critical public comment, and was mocked by political satirist Stephen Colbert at a dinner attended by President George W. Bush and the Chairman of the Joint Chiefs of Staff, General Peter Pace. Rumsfeld resigned in November 2006. By 2008, the Chairman of the Joint Chiefs of Staff, Admiral Mike Mullen, felt obliged to pen an open letter in which he reminded all servicemen that "The U.S. military must remain apolitical at all times."

Notes

References 

 
 
 
 
 
 
 
 
 
 
 
 
 
 
 
 
 
 
 
 
 
 
 
 
 
 
 
 
 
 
 
 
 
 
 
 
 
 
  plus Webcast Author Interview at the Pritzker Military Library on 24 June 2009

External links 
 The Truman Library: Firing of MacArthur, a collection of primary sources
 The Truman vs. MacArthur Controversy: Speeches, Documents, Letters, etc. from PBS
 PBS Video on Relief of MacArthur

Civil–military relations
Military history of the United States during the Korean War
MacArthur
Relief
1951 in the United States
United States in the Korean War
MacArthur, Douglas
April 1951 events in the United States
Article Two of the United States Constitution